The Uniformed Firefighters Association of Greater NY is Local 94 of the International Association of Fire Fighters, the union representing New York City Firefighters. Founded in 1917, the UFA is a non-profit advocacy organization representing the health, safety and interests of New York City Firefighters.

See also 

Fire Department of New York
Health effects of the September 11, 2001 attacks

References

External links 
Official website of Uniformed Firefighters Association of Greater New York

Firefighters associations in the United States
New York City Fire Department
Trade unions established in 1917
1917 establishments in New York City
Trade unions in New York (state)